Adrien Robinson (born September 23, 1988) is a former American football tight end. He was drafted in the 4th round (127th overall) in the 2012 NFL Draft by the New York Giants. Born in Indianapolis, Indiana, Robinson played football at Warren Central High School, winning the state championship in all of his four seasons, and played football in college for the Cincinnati Bearcats from 2008 to 2011.

Professional career

New York Giants
On May 8, 2012, Robinson agreed to terms on a four-year contract worth $2.48 million with a $385,652 signing bonus.

On November 23, 2014, Robinson caught his first touchdown pass as an NFL player, a 1-yard bootleg pass by Eli Manning, against the Dallas Cowboys.

On September 5, 2015, he was waived by the Giants.

New York Jets
Robinson signed a reserve/future contract with the New York Jets on January 11, 2016.

On May 9, 2016, Robinson was released.

Memphis Express
In 2019, Robinson joined the Memphis Express of the Alliance of American Football. The league ceased operations in April 2019.

DC Defenders
Robinson was drafted in the 10th round in the 2020 XFL Draft by the DC Defenders. He was waived during final roster cuts on January 22, 2020.

Personal life

Arrest
On July 31, 2017, Pennsylvania State Police stopped Robinson along Interstate 80 and found him in possession of “numerous large bags of marijuana." which measured at 25 pounds.

He was charged with manufacture, delivery or possession with intent to manufacture or deliver a controlled substance, and possession of drug paraphernalia.

References

1988 births
Living people
American football tight ends
Cincinnati Bearcats football players
Memphis Express (American football) players
New York Giants players
New York Jets players
DC Defenders players
Players of American football from Indianapolis